The Maids is a 1947 play by the French dramatist Jean Genet. It was first performed at the Théâtre de l'Athénée in Paris in a production that opened on 17 April 1947, which Louis Jouvet directed.

The play has been revived in France, England, and the United States on multiple occasions, sometimes with men playing the roles of the maids. A TV dramatization Stuepigerne was done by Danish national broadcaster Danmarks Radio in 1962. A film adaptation of the play was released in 1974. Swedish composer  adapted the play in 1994 for a chamber opera.

Background
Genet loosely based his play on the infamous sisters Christine and Léa Papin, who brutally murdered their employer and her daughter in Le Mans, France, in 1933. In an introduction written for The Maids, Jean-Paul Sartre quotes a line from Genet's novel Our Lady of the Flowers in which a character muses that if he had a play written for women he'd cast adolescent boys in the parts. Sartre then speculates on having this idea applied to The Maids.

Plot
Solange and Claire are two housemaids who construct elaborate sadomasochistic rituals when their mistress (Madame) is away. The focus of their role-playing is the murder of Madame and they take turns portraying both sides of the power divide. Their deliberate pace and devotion to detail guarantees that they always fail to actualize their fantasies by ceremoniously "killing" Madame at the ritual's dénouement.

Characters
 Solange - Maid/sister
 Claire - Maid/sister
 Madame - Haughty, disdainful mistress
 Monsieur - Madame's lover and thief

Production history
In Britain, the play was first presented in French by the Institute of Contemporary Arts, initially at the Mercury Theatre, Notting Hill Gate, London, in 1952. Peter Zadek directed, while Eduardo Paolozzi provided the scenic design. Selma Vaz Dias played Solange, Olive Gregg played Claire, and Oriel Ross played Madame. The production subsequently transferred to the Royal Court Theatre, where Betty Stockfeld played Madame and David de Bethel provided the scenic design. Zadek also directed the play's first production in Britain in English, which opened on 5 June 1956 at the New Lindsey Theatre Club. Selma Vaz Dias again played Solange and Betty Stockfeld played Madame, while Hazel Penwarden played Claire.

The play was produced at Tempo Playhouse in New York City in 1955, with Julie Bovasso originally as Claire and later as Solange. Bovasso won the first best actress Obie Award for The Maids.

Minos Volanakis directed the play at the Oxford Playhouse in 1963. This production was reprised in 1964 in a double bill with Bertolt Brecht's The Exception and the Rule.

The play was revived in London at the Greenwich Theatre in 1973 with the actresses Vivien Merchant as Madame, Glenda Jackson as Solange and Susannah York as Claire. This production was filmed as part of the American Film Theatre series in 1974, directed by Christopher Miles and photographed by Douglas Slocombe. Miles and Slocombe planned the 12-day shoot with a single camera which could track anywhere over the set, and deliberately implemented many of Genet's theatrical devices for the film.
The 1987 Royal Shekespeare Company's production at The Barbican (The Pit) was directed by Gerard Murphy, designed by David Ultz and starred Miles Anderson as Claire, Gerard Murphy as Solange, and Patrick Bailey as Madam. It was twinned with Deathwatch with the same actors.

Clare Davidson directed it at Dublin Theatre Festival; subsequently at The Lyric Theatre Studio Hammersmith on October 12, 1981. With Mark Rylance as Madame.

In Canada, a 2011 production at Buddies in Bad Times in Toronto, Ontario, used female and male casting, with the roles of Solange and Claire played by Diane D'Aquila and Ron Kennell.

A 2013 Sydney Theatre Company production, adapted by Andrew Upton and directed by Benedict Andrews, starred Cate Blanchett as Claire, Isabelle Huppert as Solange, and Elizabeth Debicki as the Mistress. The production was shown as part of the Lincoln Center Festival in August 2014 at New York City Center. Andrews employed contemporary devices that combined theatre with film in his use of video cameras, stylized choreography, popular “underground” music soundtracks, liberal use of profanity, and cultural modernization such as off handed comments from the Mistress on her dresses: "McQueen designed it for me."

In 2016 a production starring Uzo Aduba and Zawe Ashton as Solange and Claire, and Laura Carmichael as Mistress, was directed by Jamie Lloydand performed at Trafalgar Studios in London. The script was from the same translation as the 2013 Andrews-directed performance.

In Australia, a 2021 production starring Marta Dusseldorp and Essie Davis as Solange and Claire, and Stephanie Jack as Mistress, was directed by Ben Winspear and performed at The Playhouse Theatre in Hobart.

References

Notes

Bibliography
 
 
 
 
 
 

1947 plays
French plays adapted into films
Plays by Jean Genet
Fictional maids
BDSM-related mass media
Plays adapted into operas